Ommerenveld is a hamlet in the Dutch province of Gelderland. It is a part of the municipality of Buren, and lies about 6 km northeast of Tiel.

The postal authorities have placed it under Ommeren. Ommerenveld still has a school.

References

Populated places in Gelderland
Buren